The 2010 Bruhat Bengaluru Mahanagara Palike (Greater Bengaluru City Corporation) election was held on 4 April 2010 in all 198 Wards of Bangalore

Background 
The tenure of the Bangalore Mahanagara Palike ended on 6 November 2006. A new election was necessary to elect new Corporators and Mayor. On 6 November 2006, the BMP Council was dissolved by the State Government upon the completion of its five year term. In January 2007, the Karnataka Government issued a notification to merge the areas under then Bangalore Mahanagara Palike with seven City municipal council (CMC)'s, one Town municipal council (TMC) and 110 villages around the city to form a single administrative body, Bruhat Bengaluru Mahanagara Palike. The process was completed by April 2007 and the body was renamed Bruhat Bengaluru Mahanagara Palike (Greater Bengaluru City Corporation).

Organization 
New Mayor will be elected for a term of one year and Corporators will be in office for 5 years

Schedule 
The schedule of the election was announced by the State Election Commission on 6 March 2010. It announced that polling would be held in a single phase on 28 March and that results would be declared on 5 April 2010. It also declared that the provisions of the Model Code of Conduct came into force with immediate effect" with the said announcement.

Candidates

Results

List of successful candidates

Results summary

By-elections

See also 
 Elections in Karnataka
 Bangalore Mahanagara Palike
 List of wards in Bangalore
 List of wards in Bangalore (1995-2006)
 List of wards in Bangalore (2010-2020)

References

2010s in Karnataka
2010s in Bangalore
Elections in Bangalore
2010 elections in India